Diamilex Lucía Alexander González (born 1987) is a Venezuelan model and beauty pageant titleholder who was titled Miss Supranational Venezuela 2012. Alexander represented Venezuela in Miss Supranational 2012.

Life and career

Early life
Alexander was born in Maracaibo, Zulia. Diamilex has worked as a professional model for several years. She began her journey in beauty pageants at the age of 14.

In 2007 he participated in the French dramatic comedy film, 99 francs, directed by Jan Kounen.

Pageantry
At the beginning Diamilex obtained the title of Miss Bikini Venezuela 2008, to later participate and obtain the title of Miss World Model Bikini International 2008, in Malta.

In 2009, Alexander participated in the nineteenth edition of Miss Italia nel Mondo representing the French island of the Caribbean, Guadeloupe, managing to classify in the group of 15 semifinalists. Later on, she would become the president of Miss Italia Nel Mondo for Venezuela.

Miss Supranational Venezuela 2012 
Diamilex was selected by Katy Pulido's modeling agency to represent Venezuela in the international contest, Miss Supranational 2012, just under a month after the contest began. Initially, Miss Lara 2011, Carla Rodrigues de Flaviis, who was Top 10 of Miss Venezuela 2011, would be the Venezuelan representative in the contest, but would finally be replaced by Alexander.

Miss Supranational 2012 
Diamilex represented Venezuela in the Miss Supranational 2012 pageant, which was held on September 14, 2012, at the TV Studio Hall Mera, in Warsaw, Poland. Alexander managed to enter in the Top 12 of the special Miss Talent award. However, she was unable to qualify within the group of 20 semifinalists.

Another projects 
In 2013, she would participate in the Fox Life reality show, Lucha de Reinas. Diamilex was the first contestant to be eliminated.

Social campaigns 
Alexander was also an active part of the group of beauty queens who participated in the initiativeː Misses for Peace; this was in response to the protests that took place in Venezuela around 2014. On the other hand, Diamelix created a foundation in support of people with Down syndrome.

Filmography

References

External links
 

1987 births
Living people
Miss Venezuela winners
People from Maracaibo
Venezuelan female models